Statistics of Latvian Higher League in the 1943 season.

Overview
It was contested by 7 teams, and ASK won the championship.

League standings

References
RSSSF

Latvian Higher League seasons
1943 in Latvian football
Lat